Juaboso is a small town and is the capital of Juabeso district, a district in the Western North Region of Ghana.

References

Populated places in the Western North Region